CorelDRAW is a vector graphics editor developed and marketed by Alludo (formerly Corel Corporation). It is also the name of the Corel graphics suite, which includes the bitmap-image editor Corel Photo-Paint as well as other graphics-related programs (see below). It can serve as a digital painting platform, desktop publishing suite, and is commonly used for production art in signmaking, vinyl and laser cutting and engraving, print-on-demand and other industry processes. Reduced-feature Standard and Essentials versions are also offered.

History 
In 1987, Corel engineers Michel Bouillon and Pat Beirne undertook to develop a vector-based illustration program to bundle with their desktop publishing systems. That program, CorelDraw, was initially released in 1989. CorelDraw 1.x and 2.x ran under Windows 2.x and 3.0. CorelDraw 3.0 came into its own with Microsoft's release of Windows 3.1. The inclusion of TrueType in Windows 3.1 transformed CorelDraw into a serious illustration program capable of using system-installed outline fonts without requiring third-party software such as Adobe Type Manager; paired with a photo-editing program (Corel Photo-Paint), a font manager, Corel Capture, and several other pieces of software, it was also part of the first all-in-one graphics suite.

Features by version 

:From Windows 7, 32-bit and 64-bit supported
† CorelDraw 10 to X4 can open files of version 3 and later, but certain features may not be supported.
‡ The list of file formats that CorelDraw 10 to X4 can write may not be complete in this table.
* CorelDraw X7 on Windows 10 requires Update 5.

Platform and scripting history 
CorelDRAW was originally developed for Microsoft Windows 2.1, and versions existed for Windows 3.1x, CTOS, OS/2, and Power Macintosh. With the release of Corel Linux, CorelDRAW 9 was released with package support for Debian and Red Hat-based Linux. Version 11 was released for Mac OS X in 2001, but was then discontinued on both Linux and Mac. CorelDRAW was available only for Windows until the 2019 version became the first to support macOS.

 CorelDRAW Graphics Suite supports Windows 10, Windows 11, and macOS, including a new release for Apple silicon. A related web app and iPad app offers collaboration and markup online.

Scripting 
With version 6, Corel introduced task automation using a proprietary scripting language, Corel SCRIPT. Support for VBA (Visual Basic for Applications) macros was added in version 9, and Corel SCRIPT was eventually deprecated. Support for VSTA (Microsoft Visual Studio Tools for Applications) has been integrated in Windows versions since X5, and currently requires Visual Studio 2017. Version 2019 added Javascript as an option for cross-platform scripting with MacOS support; however, the built-in IDE does not support it as of 2020.

File format

Structure
In its first versions, the CDR file format was a completely proprietary file format primarily used for vector graphic drawings, recognizable by the first two bytes of the file being "WL". Starting with CorelDraw 3, the file format changed to a Resource Interchange File Format (RIFF) envelope, recognizable by the first four bytes of the file being "RIFF", and a "CDR*vrsn" in bytes 9 to 15, with the asterisk "*" being just a blank in early versions. Beginning with CorelDraw 4 it included the version number of the writing program in hexadecimal ("4" meaning version 4, "D" meaning version 13). The actual data chunk of the RIFF remains a Corel proprietary format.

From version X4 (14) on, the CDR file is a ZIP-compressed directory of several files, among them XML files and the RIFF-structured riffdata.cdr with the familiar version signature in versions X4 (CDREvrsn) and X5 (CDRFvrsn), and a root.dat with CorelDraw X6, where the bytes 9 to 15 look slightly different – "CDRGfver" in a file created with X6. "F" was the last valid hex digit, and the "fver" now indicates that the letter before no longer represents a hex digit.

There is no publicly available CDR file format specification.

Other CorelDraw file formats include CorelDraw Compressed (CDX), CorelDraw Template (CDT) and Corel Presentation Exchange (CMX).

Use of CDR files in other programs
In December 2006 the sK1 open-source project team started to reverse-engineer the CDR format. The results and the first working snapshot of the CDR importer were presented at the Libre Graphics Meeting 2007 conference taking place in May 2007 in Montreal (Canada). Later on the team parsed the structure of other Corel formats with the help of the open source CDR Explorer. As of 2008, the sK1 project claims to have the best import support for CorelDraw file formats among open source software programs. The sK1 project also developed the UniConvertor, a command line open source tool which supports conversion from CorelDraw ver.7-X4 formats (CDR/CDT/CCX/CDRX/CMX) to other formats. UniConvertor is also used in the Inkscape and Scribus open source projects as an external tool for importing CorelDraw files.

In 2007, Microsoft blocked CDR file format in Microsoft Office 2003 with the release of Service Pack 3 for Office 2003. Microsoft later apologized for inaccurately blaming the CDR file format and other formats for security problems in Microsoft Office and released some tools for solving this problem.

In 2012 the joint LibreOffice/re-lab team implemented libcdr, a library for reading CDR files from version 7 to X3 and CMX files. The library has extensive support for shapes and their properties, including support for color management and spot colors, and has a basic support for text. The library provides a built-in converter to SVG, and a converter to OpenDocument is provided by writerperfect package. The libcdr library is used in LibreOffice starting from version 3.6, and thanks to public API it can be freely used by other applications.

Other applications supporting CDR files

CDR file format import is partially or fully supported in following applications:
 Adobe Illustrator – CorelDraw 5, 6, 7, 8, 9, 10
 CorelCAD
 Corel PaintShop Pro
 Corel WordPerfect Office
 Inkscape - CorelDRAW versions 7 through X4
 LibreOffice using libcdr
 Adobe FreeHand – CorelDraw 7, 8
 Microsoft Visio 2002 – CorelDraw! drawing file versions 3.0, 4.0, 5.0, 6.0 and 7.0 (.cdr), Corel Clipart (.cmx)
 sK1 – partial support
 Xara Designer Pro and Xara Photo & Graphic Designer – early versions of CorelDraw CDR and CMX

See also 
 Comparison of vector graphics editors
 Comparison of raster-to-vector conversion software

Notes and references

External links 

 
 Official CorelDRAW Community
 Corelclub.org The CorelDRAW users community in Spanish

Corel software
Vector graphics editors
Raster to vector conversion software
Windows-only software
Font editors